James Gibbons (1834–1921) was an American prelate of the Catholic Church.

James Gibbons may also refer to:
 James Gibbons (footballer) (born 1998), English footballer
 James Gibbons (rugby union) (born 1993), English rugby union player
 James F. Gibbons (born 1931), American professor and academic administrator

See also 
 Jim Gibbons (disambiguation)
 James Gibbon (1819–1888), land speculator and politician in Queensland, Australia